Omran or Omrane may refer to:

Places
 Al-Omran (also spelled Al-Umran), a city in Al-Ahsa Governorate, Saudi Arabia
Ahmad-e Omran also known as Maʿbūdī, a village in Jazireh-ye Minu Rural District, Minu District, Khorramshahr County, Khuzestan Province, Iran
Bou Omrane, a town in central Tunisia in Gafsa Governorate
Omran Kandi, a village in Nazarkahrizi Rural District, Nazarkahrizi District, Hashtrud County, East Azerbaijan Province, Iran
El Omrane Mosque, a mosque in Tunis
Souk El Omrane, one of the markets of Bab Jebli in the medina of Sfax, Tunisia

People

Given name

Omran
Omran Daqneesh, a Syrian boy who, at age five, gained media attention after footage of him injured in what was alleged to have been an air strike appeared on the Internet
Omran Haydary (born 1998), Dutch-born Afghan football player 
Omran Sharaf, Project Manager of the United Arab Emirates' first Mission to Mars (Hope) and the Director of the Programs Management Department at the Mohammed bin Rashid Space Centre
Omran al-Zoubi (1959–2018), Syrian politician and government minister

Omrane
Omrane Sadok (born 1937), Tunisian boxer

Surname

Omran
Abbas Al Omran, Bahraini human rights and labor activist
Adnan Omran (born 1934), Syrian diplomat, politician, government minister 
Amal Omran (born 1968), Syrian actress and director of Syria play
Aseel Omran, Saudi Arabian singer
Lo'ay Omran, Jordanian football player
Lojain Omran (born 1977), Saudi-Arabian TV and social media personality
Nabil Omran (born 1981), Libyan futsal player

Omrane
Kamel Omrane (1951–2018), Tunisian scholar of Islam, politician and minister

Business and Economy
 Omran Company, a government-owned company mandated to drive the investment, growth and development of the tourism sector in the Sultanate of Oman
 Omran Sahel, an Iranian company owned or controlled by Khatam al-Anbia

See also
 Imran, a spelling of this name